Pierre Cabanes (born December 30, 1930, in Le Puy-en-Velay, France) is a French epigraphist and historian, professor emeritus of the history of antiquity at the University of Paris X-Nanterre, former President of the University Clermont-Ferrand II (1977–1982), and former head, from 1992, of the French Archaeological and Epigraphic Mission in Albania.

Publications 
 L'Épire, de la mort de Pyrrhos à la conquête romaine (272-167 av. J.C.), Les Belles Lettres, 1976,
 Les états fédéraux de Grèce du Nord-Ouest : pouvoirs locaux et pouvoir fédéral, Athènes, Faculté autonome des sciences politiques, 1981, 
 Les Illyriens : de Bardylis à Genthios (IV - II), SEDES , 1988, p. 342 
 Albanie : le pays des aigles, préfacé par Ismail Kadaré ; photographies Paul Lutz, Édisud , 1994, 
 Le Monde hellénistique. De la mort d'Alexandre à la paix d'Apamée, Points histoire, Nouvelle Histoire de l'Antiquité,  Le Seuil, 1995, p. 288 
 Passions albanaises : de Berisha au Kosovo (co-auteur : son fils Bruno Cabanes), O. Jacob, 1999, p. 280 
 L’Histoire de l’Adriatique, Direction de la rédaction, préface de Jacques Le Goff, le Seuil, coll. L’Univers historique, 2001, p. 672 
 Introduction à l'Histoire de l'Antiquité, 3 édition, Armand Colin, 2004
 Le monde grec, 2 édition refondue, Armand Colin, 2008
 Idées reçues sur l'Antiquité : de la Mésopotamie à l'Empire romain, Le Cavalier Bleu, 2014
 Petit atlas historique de l'Antiquité grecque, 2 édition, Armand Colin , 2016

See also 
 Illyrology

References 

1930 births
Living people
20th-century French historians
21st-century French historians
20th-century French archaeologists
21st-century French archaeologists